Events from the year 1969 in Argentina.

Incumbents
President: Juan Carlos Onganía

Governors
Buenos Aires Province: Francisco A. Imaz (until 16 June); Saturnino Llorente (from 16 June)
Chubut Province: Guillermo Pérez Pitton
Mendoza Province: José Eugenio Blanco

Vice Governors
Buenos Aires Province: vacant

Events
 May – Cordobazo uprising
 May–September – Rosariazo uprising

Births
 February 1 – Gabriel Batistuta, footballer
 September 12 – Ángel Cabrera, golfer

See also
List of Argentine films of 1969

Deaths

 
Years of the 20th century in Argentina